Robert Townsend Layton (16 April 1884 – 3 November 1941) was an English special effects artist. He was nominated for an Oscar for Best Special Effects on the film The Long Voyage Home at the 13th Academy Awards.

References

External links
 

1884 births
1941 deaths
Special effects people
People from Cambridge